James Merry (1805 – 3 February 1877 ) was a Scottish ironmaster and race-horse breeder and a Liberal politician who sat in the House of Commons from 1859 to 1874.

Merry was the son of James Merry, merchant of Glasgow, and his wife  Janet Creelman daughter of W. Creelman. He was educated at the University of Glasgow and became an ironmaster in Lanarkshire and Ayrshire. He was an influential member of "the Turf", and breeder of some of the best English race-horses including Thormanby which won the Derby in 1860, Dundee, Buckstone and Scottish Chief. He also won the Derby in 1873 with Doncaster. He was a Deputy Lieutenant and J.P. for Inverness-shire'

Merry stood unsuccessfully for parliament at Glasgow in February 1857. He was elected MP for Falkirk Burghs in April 1857 but was unseated on petition the following July. At the 1859 general election Merry was elected MP for Falkirk Burghs and held the seat until 1874.

In 1857 Merry bought the Belladrum Estate, near Beauly.

Merry died at the age of 70.

Merry married Ann McHardy, daughter of James McHardy of Glenboig, Lanarkshire in 1847.

Merry Island, off the Sunshine Coast of British Columbia, is named for Merry.

References

External links
 

1805 births
1877 deaths
Deputy Lieutenants of Inverness-shire
Scottish Liberal Party MPs
Members of the Parliament of the United Kingdom for Scottish constituencies
UK MPs 1857–1859
UK MPs 1859–1865
UK MPs 1868–1874
Alumni of the University of Glasgow
British racehorse owners and breeders
Owners of Epsom Derby winners